Sawyer Motor Company Building is a historic automobile showroom and service facility located at Asheville, Buncombe County, North Carolina.  It was built in 1925, and is a four-story, steel frame and reinforced concrete building sheathed in brick. The building is trimmed with cast concrete.

It was listed on the National Register of Historic Places in 1979.

References

External links

Commercial buildings on the National Register of Historic Places in North Carolina
Commercial buildings completed in 1925
Buildings and structures in Asheville, North Carolina
National Register of Historic Places in Buncombe County, North Carolina